Thymophylla pentachaeta, also known as fiveneedle pricklyleaf, golden dyssodia or dogweed, is a perennial or subshrub in the family Asteraceae. The species is native to the southwestern United States and Mexico.

Four varieties are recognised:
Thymophylla pentachaeta var. belenidium
Thymophylla pentachaeta var. hartwegii
Thymophylla pentachaeta var. pentachaeta
Thymophylla pentachaeta var. puberula

References

Thymophylla pentachaeta Flora of North America
Dyssodia pentachaeta University of Arizona Pima County Cooperative Extension

Tageteae